Connoisseur's Bakery (commonly referred to simply as Connoisseurs) is a large bakery company in Newtownards, Northern Ireland. It serves cities, towns and villages in County Down and County Antrim. It serves many stores across these counties including The Griffin (until its closure in 2012), Spar, Centra, Vivo, Costcutter, Nisa and Mace.

References

Food manufacturers of the United Kingdom
Bakeries of the United Kingdom